The Logan Construction Company was founded in 1903 in Chillicothe, Ohio. They were manufacturers of the Logan automobile until 1908.

History 
Benjamin A. Gramm was the designer of the Buckeye and Gramm automobiles before entering production with the Logan in 1904. Logan's were 2-cylinder air-cooled and water-cooled touring cars before standardizing with a 4-cylinder air-cooled car in 1906.

In 1907 a runabout model called the Blue Streak semi-racer was introduced with a 24-hp engine. This sold for $1,750,.  A truck producer along with automobiles, a new company was formed to concentrate on truck manufacturing in 1908. Gramm trucks built up to 1940.

Advertisements
In 1907 Benjamin Gramm sued Premier Motor Manufacturing Company for infringement on the Logan slogan of "That Car of Quality". He was awarded priority of claim.

References

Defunct motor vehicle manufacturers of the United States
Vehicle manufacturing companies established in 1903
Vehicle manufacturing companies disestablished in 1908
Defunct manufacturing companies based in Ohio
1903 establishments in Ohio
1908 disestablishments in Ohio

Brass Era vehicles
1900s cars
Motor vehicle manufacturers based in Ohio
Cars introduced in 1903
Veteran vehicles